Arturo Emilio Rodenak (13 April 1931 – 26 September 2012) was an Argentine–born Chilean footballer, regarded as one of the greatest players in Rangers’ history.

Personal ife
Rodenak naturalized Chilean by residence in 1962.

In 2009, he starred a short film called Palitroque (Breadstick) where he appeared drinking wine in the Estadio Fiscal de Talca and remembering his years as Rangers player as well as the origin of his nickname.

He died in Talca, Chile, aged 81.

References

External links
 

1931 births
2012 deaths
Footballers from La Plata
Argentine footballers
Argentina youth international footballers
Argentine expatriate footballers
Argentine emigrants to Chile
Naturalized citizens of Chile
Chilean footballers
Chilean expatriate footballers
Club de Gimnasia y Esgrima La Plata footballers
Club Atlético Tigre footballers
Rangers de Talca footballers
Audax Italiano footballers
Deportes Iberia footballers
San Antonio Unido footballers
Oriente Petrolero players
Club San José players
Argentine Primera División players
Chilean Primera División players
Primera B de Chile players
Bolivian Primera División players
Argentine expatriate sportspeople in Chile
Expatriate footballers in Chile
Argentine expatriate sportspeople in Bolivia
Chilean expatriate sportspeople in Bolivia
Expatriate footballers in Bolivia
Association football goalkeepers
Argentine football managers
Argentine expatriate football managers
Chilean football managers
Rangers de Talca managers
Chilean Primera División managers
Primera B de Chile managers
Argentine people of Slovak descent
Chilean people of Slovak descent